Ridout is a surname. Notable people with the surname include:

 Alan Ridout (1934–1996), British composer and teacher
 Alexandra Ridout, British jazz trumpeter
 Dudley Ridout (1866–1941), British soldier
 George Percival Ridout (1807–1873), British-Canadian merchant and politician
 Godfrey Ridout (1918–1984), Canadian composer and teacher
 Heather Ridout (born 1954), Australian businesswoman
 Herbert C. Ridout (1881–1948), British journalist and writer
 John Ridout (died 1817), Canadian duel victim
 Louis Ridout (born 1990), English bowls player
 Matilda Ridout Edgar (1844–1910), Canadian historian and feminist
 Ronald Ridout (1916–1994), British textbook author
 Thomas Ridout (disambiguation), several people

See also 
 Rideout